Welcome to the Neighbourhood or Welcome to the Neighborhood may refer to:
 Welcome to the Neighbourhood (Meat Loaf album), a studio album by Meat Loaf
 Welcome to the Neighbourhood (Boston Manor album), a studio album by Boston Manor
 Welcome to the Neighborhood (TV series), an unaired television series
 "Welcome to the Neighborhood" (The 7D), a television episode